Nggam is a type of divination found among many groups in western Cameroon. Among the best documented is its practice by the Mambila people of Cameroon and Nigeria, in which the actions of spiders or crabs are interpreted by the diviner.  The form used by the neighbouring Yamba people was described by Gebauer in 1964 based on experience in Mbem going back to before 1939, and more recently by Hermann Gufler (1996 and 2003). Good documentation of Nggam has been also published for the Bekpak (Bafia) people by Dugast and for Bamileke people by Pradeles de Latour. The crab form has been studied in north Cameroon by Walter van Beek (2013, 2015).

The comparative linguistics of spider divination in Cameroon was surveyed by Blench and Zeitlyn in 1989/1990.

In 2021, Argentinian artist Tomás Saraceno developed a durational community project as part of the Berliner Festspiele’s Immersion programme. Described as “a web portal by, with and for the spider diviners of Somié, Cameroon”, the project invites audiences to learn about the practice.

See also 
 African divination

References

External links 
 Mambila spider divination
 Nggàm dù - Spider divination with Somié, Cameroon

Divination